The  is a criticallyendangered Japanese breed of small horse. It is one of eight Japanese native horse breeds, and lives as a feral horse in a natural setting in a designated National Monument on Cape Toi (also known as Toimisaki) within the municipal boundaries of Kushima at the south end of Miyazaki Prefecture on the island of Kyūshū. The Misaki was made a Japanese National Natural Treasure in 1953.

History 

Japanese horses are thought to derive from stock brought at several different times from various parts of the Asian mainland; the first such importations took place by the sixth century at the latest. Horses were used for farming – as pack-animals although not for draught power; until the advent of firearms in the later sixteenth century, they were much used for warfare.

The breed was first identified in the historical record in 1697 when the Akizuki family of the Takanabe Clan rounded up feral horses and developed a pool of breeding stock.

The Misaki and the area in which it lives, Cape Toi, were declared a Natural Monument in 1953 (Shōwa 28).. The horses are a popular draw for tourists in the region.

In 2007, the Misaki was classified as "critical-maintained" by the FAO. The population is approximately 120, up from a low of 53 individuals recorded in 1973.

A genetic study of Japanese and Mongolian horse breeds in 2003 found the Misaki to be most closely related to the Noma, Tokara and Yonaguni breeds. In 2011, twelve horses of the Misaki herd gave positive Coggins test results for equine infectious anaemia. From the blood of one of them, the whole viral genome was sequenced. It was found to be substantially different from the two equine infectious anaemia strains that had previously been completely sequenced.

Characteristics 

References

Horse breeds
Horse breeds originating in Japan
Feral horses
Natural monuments of Japan